Massachusetts's nineteenth congressional district is an obsolete district. Its short tenure (1813-1821) was dedicated to the Maine District until Maine achieved statehood.

List of members representing the district

References

 Congressional Biographical Directory of the United States 1774–present
 

19
Former congressional districts of the United States
Constituencies established in 1813
Constituencies disestablished in 1821
1813 establishments in Massachusetts
1821 disestablishments in Massachusetts